The Abram Minis Building is a historic building in Savannah, Georgia, United States. Located in the northeastern trust block of Franklin Square, at 317 West Bryan Street and 20–22 Montgomery Street, it dates to 1846, making it the oldest extant building on the square. It was built as a commercial property for 26-year-old Abraham Minis, a prominent merchant of the city and founder of A. Minis & Sons.

In a survey for the Historic Savannah Foundation, Mary Lane Morrison found the building to be of significant status.

See also 
 Buildings in Savannah Historic District

References 

Commercial buildings in Savannah
Commercial buildings completed in 1846
Franklin Square (Savannah, Georgia) buildings
Savannah Historic District